Walter Berry (born May 14, 1964) is an American former professional basketball player. After spending three seasons in the National Basketball Association (NBA), he had a very successful career in various leagues around Europe and the EuroLeague. Berry played the power forward position. Berry, who originated from New York City, New York, was nicknamed "The Truth", early in his playing career. He was inducted into the Greek Basket League Hall of Fame in 2022.

College career

Berry played college basketball for his hometown college, St. John's University, with the then called St. John's Redmen. At St. John's he won the John Wooden Award, the Big East Men's Basketball Player of the Year award, plus the USBWA College Player of the Year award in 1986, after averaging 23 points and 11.1 rebounds per game. Berry, nicknamed, "The Truth", was also the second leading scorer on St. John's 1985 Final Four team.

Professional career

NBA
Berry was selected by the Portland Trail Blazers with the 14th overall pick in the 1986 NBA draft. He only played 7 games for the Blazers before he was traded to the San Antonio Spurs in exchange for Kevin Duckworth. He spent three seasons in the NBA, from 1986 to 1989, with the Trail Blazers, Spurs, New Jersey Nets, and Houston Rockets. However, he did not get along with some of his coaches, including Larry Brown, while with the San Antonio Spurs. He was released by the New Jersey Nets, after failure to conform to team policy. He holds NBA career averages of 14.1 points and 4.7 rebounds per game.

Europe
In 1989, Berry went to Italy, where he played for Italian LBA League club Paini Napoli. After that, he spent much of his career playing in Greece, in the Greek Basket League and the EuroLeague, where he forged a reputation as one of the most savvy scorers, with a wide variety of shots and ways of scoring.

Later career
Berry would continue to play basketball for Jayson Williams' NBA Charity Team. He joined Jayson Williams at the 2002 Winter Olympics in Salt Lake City, where Williams' NBA charity team played exhibition games.

NBA career statistics

Regular season 

|-
| style="text-align:left;"| 
| style="text-align:left;"|Portland
| 7 || 0 || 2.7 || .750 || – || 1.000 || 1.0 || 0.1 || 0.3 || 0.0 || 1.9
|-
| style="text-align:left;"| 
| style="text-align:left;"|San Antonio
| 56 || 45 || 28.0 || .529 || .000 || .648 || 5.4 || 1.9 || 0.6 || 0.7 || 17.6
|-
| style="text-align:left;"| 
| style="text-align:left;"|San Antonio
| 73 || 56 || 26.3 || .563 || – || .600 || 5.4 || 1.5 || 0.8 || 0.9 || 17.4
|-
| style="text-align:left;"| 
| style="text-align:left;"|New Jersey
| 29 || 17 || 19.2 || .468 || – || .683 || 4.0 || 0.7 || 0.3 || 0.4 || 8.9
|-
| style="text-align:left;"| 
| style="text-align:left;"|Houston
| 40 || 14 || 20.0 || .541 || .500 || .713 || 3.8 || 1.4 || 0.5 || 0.9 || 8.8
|- class="sortbottom"
| style="text-align:center;" colspan="2"| Career
| 205 || 132 || 23.7 || .539 || .200 || .638 || 4.7 || 1.4 || 0.6 || 0.7 || 14.1

Playoffs 

|-
|style="text-align:left;"|1988
|style="text-align:left;"|San Antonio
|3||0||31.3||.540||.000||.800||7.0||2.0||1.7||0.7||22.0
|-
|style="text-align:left;"|1989
|style="text-align:left;"|Houston
|4||0||14.3||.500||–||.875||2.3||1.3||0.5||0.3||8.3
|- class="sortbottom"
| style="text-align:center;" colspan="2"| Career
| 7 || 0 || 21.6 || .526 || .000 || .826 || 4.3 || 1.6 || 1.0 || 0.4 || 14.1

References

External links
 FIBA EuroLeague Profile
 Berry's NBA stats @ Basketball-Reference.com
 Italian League Profile 
 Spanish League Profile 
 Greek League Profile 
 1986 Oscar Robertson Trophy

1964 births
Living people
African-American basketball players
All-American college men's basketball players
American expatriate basketball people in Greece
American expatriate basketball people in Italy
American expatriate basketball people in Slovenia
American expatriate basketball people in Spain
American expatriate basketball people in Venezuela
American men's basketball players
Basketball players from New York City
Aris B.C. players
Houston Rockets players
Iraklis Thessaloniki B.C. players
Liga ACB players
Makedonikos B.C. players
New Jersey Nets players
Olympiacos B.C. players
Pallacanestro Cantù players
Panteras de Miranda players
P.A.O.K. BC players
People from East Harlem
Portland Trail Blazers draft picks
Portland Trail Blazers players
Power forwards (basketball)
San Antonio Spurs players
San Jacinto Central Ravens men's basketball players
Sportspeople from Manhattan
St. John's Red Storm men's basketball players
21st-century African-American people
20th-century African-American sportspeople